Låt mig få tända ett ljus is a 1987 Jan Malmsjö Christmas album, released on the Little Big Apple label to LP., cassette tape and CD

In 1991, the album was rereleased by the Mariann label to CD. and cassette tape.

In 1993, the album was once again rereleased. This time, the CD version was by the KM label. and the cassette tape by the Mariann label.

Track listing
Låt mig få tända ett ljus (Schlafe, mein Prinzchen, schlaf ein)
Natten tänder ljus på himlen
Stilla natt (Stille Nacht, heilige Nacht)
Jag drömmer om en jul hemma
Vem är det barnet
Ser du stjärnan i det blå (When You Wish upon a Star)
Nu tändas tusen juleljus
Jul i Gamla stan (Christmas in New York)
Jul, jul, strålande jul
Varje människa har ett ljus (Mary's Boy Child)
En jul utan dig
Christmas medley

Contributors
Lasse Wellander - guitar
Peter Ljung - keyboard
Sam Bengtsson - bass
Klas Anderhell - drums

Chart positions

References 

Jan Malmsjö albums
1987 Christmas albums
Christmas albums by Swedish artists
Schlager Christmas albums